John Horace Deane (1842–1913) was a politician in Queensland, Australia. He was a Member of the Queensland Legislative Assembly and a Member of the Queensland Legislative Council.

Politics
John Deane was a member of the Dalrymple Shire Council from 1880 to 1889 and from 1891 to 1911. During that period, he was chairman of the Council from 1880 to 1884 and again in 1890.

Deane was elected to the Queensland Legislative Assembly in the electoral district of Townsville in the 1878 election on 28 November 1878 as a supporter of Thomas McIlwraith. He never spoke in parliament and resigned on 3 February 1879, standing aside to allow John Murtagh Macrossan (who had already been appointed Minister for Works and Mines in the McIlwraith Ministry) to win the resulting by-election on 4 March 1879.

On 31 July 1889, Deane was appointed to the Queensland Legislative Council. A lifetime appointment, he held it until his death on 27 October 1913.

Later life 
Dean died on 27 October 1913 and was  buried in Townsville's West End Cemetery.

References

Members of the Queensland Legislative Assembly
1842 births
1913 deaths
Members of the Queensland Legislative Council